SteamWorld Dig 2 is a single-player 2D platform action-adventure metroidvania video game developed and published by Image & Form. It is the fourth installment in the SteamWorld series of games and the direct sequel to 2013's SteamWorld Dig. It was first released in September 2017 for Nintendo Switch, Linux, macOS, Windows, PlayStation 4, and PlayStation Vita. It was later released for Nintendo 3DS in February 2018, for Xbox One in November 2018, for Stadia in March 2020, and for Amazon Luna in October 2020.

Publisher Rising Star Games released physical retail copies of the game for the Nintendo Switch and PlayStation 4 in 2018.

Gameplay

SteamWorld Dig 2 is a metroidvania. Carrying on from its predecessor, SteamWorld Dig, the game puts players in control of Dorothy, a steam-driven robot searching for Rusty, the protagonist of the previous game who disappeared. Gameplay largely involves exploring a vast underground mine, coming up against enemy creatures while finding various resources as the player digs their way downwards. As the game progresses, Dorothy can gain abilities and weapons such as pressure bombs, a hookshot, and a pneumatic arm that can punch through rock. Any resources found can be traded in for cash in the game's hub world, where the player can upgrade their health, weapons, and abilities. Each of the weapons have perks that can be activated by installing Upgrade Cogs found in secret areas. More blueprints for upgrades become available to the player by either increasing their level by killing enemies or completing quests, or by finding artifacts hidden in the mines.

Plot
The story takes place in between the events of SteamWorld Dig and SteamWorld Heist. Following Rusty's disappearance at the end of SteamWorld Dig, Dorothy, a robot who he had befriended, travels to the mining town of El Machino in order to search for him. Along the way, she comes across Fen, a remnant of the Vectron that Rusty had previously fought, who joins Dorothy as a navigator. While searching the mines for Rusty while also hearing rumors of him turning into a monstrous machine, Dorothy comes across a group of devolved humans, addicted to the drug moon juice. The humans are led by Rosie, who instead of becoming addicted to moon juice took to lifting weights at a young age and who is much smarter than the other humans, called shiners. 

Rosie claims that mysterious machines are triggering earthquakes. Dorothy goes to destroy these machines, only to discover that Rosie had lied to her. In actuality, the machines were built by Rusty to prevent Rosie from harnessing the power of a fusion distillery in order to create more of the addictive substance known as moon juice in order to control the remaining humans. Dorothy manages to defeat Rosie and rescue Rusty, only for the distillery to become unstable, prompting Fen to stay behind while she warps the two to safety, allowing them to escape on a rocket with the other El Machino residents before the planet explodes. As the robots explore space in order to set up a new civilization, Dorothy remains hopeful that she will one day be reunited with Fen.

Reception

SteamWorld Dig 2 received positive reviews, with a score of 88 out of 100 on Metacritic. Critics praised its improvements upon the original, as well as its world and gameplay.

The game was nominated for "Best Portable Game" in Destructoid Game of the Year Awards 2017, for "Best Switch Game" and "Best Action-Adventure Game" in IGN's Best of 2017 Awards, for "Game Engineering" at the 17th Annual National Academy of Video Game Trade Reviewers Awards, and for "Best Indie Game" at the 2018 Golden Joystick Awards.

References

External links
 Official website

2017 video games
Action-adventure games
Indie video games
Metroidvania games
Nintendo 3DS eShop games
Nintendo Switch games
Platform games
PlayStation 4 games
PlayStation Network games
PlayStation Vita games
Video games about robots
Single-player video games
Steampunk video games
Interquel video games
Windows games
MacOS games
Linux games
Video games developed in Sweden
Video games featuring female protagonists
Video games set on fictional planets
SteamWorld
Stadia games
Rising Star Games games